Dark Castle is an American doom metal band formed by guitarist–vocalist Stevie Floyd and drummer–vocalist Rob Shaffer in 2005. They released their first full-length album, Spirited Migration, in 2009.

Discography

Studio albums
 Spirited Migration (At A Loss Recordings, 2009)
 Surrender to All Life Beyond Form (Profound Lore Records, 2011)

EPs
 Flight of Pegasus (self-released, 2007)

References

External links
 Dark Castle (official MySpace site)
 Dark Castle (official Facebook site)

Musical groups established in 2005
American doom metal musical groups
Heavy metal musical groups from Florida
American musical duos